Once Were Brothers: Robbie Robertson and the Band is a 2019 Canadian documentary film, directed by Daniel Roher. A portrait of the influential roots rock group The Band, the film is based in part on Robbie Robertson's 2017 memoir Testimony.

The film premiered on September 5, 2019, as the opening film of the 2019 Toronto International Film Festival, the first time the festival has ever selected a Canadian documentary film as its opening gala. The website's critics consensus reads, "Once Were Brothers  frustrate Band fans looking for a less narrowly focused overview, but the group's music and history remain as engrossing as ever."

References

External links
 
 
 

2019 films
2019 documentary films
Canadian documentary films
Documentary films about musical groups
The Band
Robbie Robertson
Imagine Entertainment films
Films directed by Daniel Roher
2010s English-language films
2010s Canadian films